Brian Dawson (born 31 October 1958) is an Australian rules football coach and academic.

Playing career
Dawson joined  in 1975, initially playing in the colts team. He also played a total of eight seasons and 134 matches with Osborne Park in the Sunday Football League.

Coaching career
Between 1988 and 2000 Dawson was fitness coach for the West Coast Eagles. He was made a life member by the club in 2007.

He resigned as Swans coach after the end of the 2010 WAFL season when work commitments in Japan prevented him from committing to full-time coaching in 2011.

At the conclusion of the 2014 WAFL season, Dawson received the JJ Leonard Medal as the Coach of the Year, after guiding the Royals to a second straight grand final, and his fourth in five seasons as a league coach.

Academic life
In 1981 Dawson completed a master's degree in physical education studying the effects of heat stress on athletes. He completed a Doctor of Philosophy degree (PhD) on athletes' heat tolerance.

Dawson is director of community and public programs at the University of Western Australia (UWA) and holds the title of Winthrop Professor.

In 2004 Dawson wrote a biography of John Todd, titled John Todd: Six decades of Footy. He has written numerous articles and books on training and recovery techniques for sportspeople.

Dawson is the chair of the science and football steering group of the World Commission of Science and Sports.

References

Australian rules footballers from Western Australia
Swan Districts Football Club players
Swan Districts Football Club coaches
East Perth Football Club coaches
Academic staff of the University of Western Australia
1958 births
Living people